Inverness TMD is a railway traction maintenance depot situated in Inverness, Scotland. The depot, visible from Inverness station, is operated by ScotRail. The current depot code is IS, previously the shed code was 60A. 37025, owned by the Scottish Thirty-Seven Group is named 'Inverness TMD'.

Allocation
Class 08 X 2
Class 158, 158701 to 158722
Independent Drift Snowploughs, ADB 965234 and ADB 965243

References

Rail Atlas Great Britain & Ireland, S.K. Baker 

Transport in Highland (council area)
Inverness
Rail transport in Scotland
Railway depots in Scotland